Scott Gates (born 14 April 1988 in Wegberg, North Rhine-Westphalia) is a German-born football midfielder. The left winger rose through the Dundee ranks from the under-12 team to the full squad.

Gates was a former pupil of Madras College in St Andrews and played for Fife side Tayport Thistle, until joining Dundee FC Youth Development Squad aged 13. He made his first-team debut on 1 October 2005 against Brechin City in a Scottish Division 1 fixture whilst still only 17. He has continued to feature in the first team and has been capped at under-17 level for Scotland.

He joined Montrose on loan in July 2007, then Cowdenbeath in February 2008. He joined Arbroath on a one-year contract in May 2008 after being freed by Dundee.

On 3 March 2009, Winger Scott Gates, who was recently released by Arbroath, has signed for junior side Carnoustie Panmure. Gates, who started his career at Dundee, had a loan spell at Highland League Champions Cove Rangers earlier this season. After 3 seasons, the fans favourite moved to local rivals Lochee United in 2012. Gates spent a further 3 seasons at the Bluebells before joining the East Junior Champions Kelty Hearts FC.

References

External links
 

1988 births
Arbroath F.C. players
Association football midfielders
Carnoustie Panmure F.C. players
Dundee F.C. players
Forfar Athletic F.C. players
Living people
Lochee United F.C. players
Montrose F.C. players
People from Wegberg
Sportspeople from Cologne (region)
Scotland youth international footballers
Scottish Football League players
Scottish footballers
Footballers from North Rhine-Westphalia
Kelty Hearts F.C. players